Palaeorhynchus (meaning "old snout") is a genus of prehistoric fish from Central and Southeastern Europe that was described by Wagner in 1860. One fossil found is dated  (Early Oligocene).

References
Palaeorhynchus, Paleobiology Database

External links

Acanthomorpha
Oligocene fish
Extinct animals of Europe